Alessio Sergio Fernando da Cruz (born 18 January 1997) is a professional footballer who plays as a forward or winger for Belgian club Mechelen. Born in the Netherlands, he represented the country on junior international levels, before switching allegiance to Cape Verde for senior level in 2022.

Club career
Da Cruz was scouted aged 10 by Ajax at local side BAS in Biddinghuizen and also played in the youth teams of Almere City and FC Twente. He made his Eredivisie debut on 15 August 2015 against ADO Den Haag. He replaced Bruno Uvini at half-time in a 1–4 home defeat. He was sent out on loan to FC Dordrecht in 2016. Da Cruz left Twente in July 2017 to join up with Italian side Novara. During his time at Novara he went on to put in some impressive displays. Altogether Da Cruz was capped for a sum of 19 matches and scored 5 goals during his six months at the club.

In January 2018, despite mounting interest from English club Arsenal, he signed up with Serie B side Parma for €3 million.

On 11 January 2019, Da Cruz joined on loan to Italian Serie B side Spezia until 30 June 2019.

On 1 August 2019, Da Cruz joined Ascoli on loan with an option to buy.

On 29 January 2020, Da Cruz joined English Championship side Sheffield Wednesday on loan until the end of the season.

On 3 October 2020, Da Cruz moved to Dutch Eredivisie club Groningen on a one-season loan deal with an option to buy.

On 3 August 2021, Da Cruz joined Liga MX club Santos Laguna on loan for a season.

On 10 January 2022, he returned to Italy and joined Vicenza on loan.

On 12 July 2022, Da Cruz signed with Mechelen in Belgium for two years with an option to extend.

International career
Born in the Netherlands, Da Cruz is of Cape Verdean descent. He is a youth international for the Netherlands.

In March 2022 he was called up by Cape Verde national football team for 3 friendlies to be held at the end of that month.

Career statistics

References

External links
 

1997 births
Living people
Footballers from Almere
Dutch sportspeople of Cape Verdean descent
Association football wingers
Dutch footballers
Cape Verdean footballers
Netherlands youth international footballers
FC Twente players
FC Dordrecht players
Novara F.C. players
Parma Calcio 1913 players
Spezia Calcio players
Ascoli Calcio 1898 F.C. players
Sheffield Wednesday F.C. players
FC Groningen players
Santos Laguna footballers
L.R. Vicenza players
K.V. Mechelen players
Eredivisie players
Eerste Divisie players
English Football League players
Serie A players
Serie B players
Liga MX players
Dutch expatriate footballers
Cape Verdean expatriate footballers
Expatriate footballers in Italy
Dutch expatriate sportspeople in Italy
Cape Verdean expatriate sportspeople in Italy
Expatriate footballers in England
Dutch expatriate sportspeople in England
Cape Verdean expatriate sportspeople in England
Expatriate footballers in Mexico
Dutch expatriate sportspeople in Mexico
Cape Verdean expatriate sportspeople in Mexico
Expatriate footballers in Belgium
Dutch expatriate sportspeople in Belgium
Cape Verdean expatriate sportspeople in Belgium
Jong FC Twente players